Odd Granlund (15 February 1910 – 2 September 1982) was a Norwegian broadcasting person. He was born in Bergen. He was a central person in the early development of television in Norway. He served as administrative manager of the Norwegian Broadcasting Corporation from 1963 to 1980.

References 

1910 births
1982 deaths
Mass media people from Bergen
NRK people